The University of Tennessee Arboretum (250 acres) is a research and educational arboretum operated by the University of Tennessee Agricultural Experiment Station. It is located at 901 South Illinois Avenue (State Highway 62), Oak Ridge, Tennessee. It is open to the public without charge. Outdoor areas are open daily from 8:00 a.m. until sunset; the office and visitor center are open weekdays during normal office hours. 

The arboretum contains approximately 2,500 native and exotic woody plant specimens, representing 800 species, varieties, and cultivars, with good collections of azaleas, conifers, crabapples, dogwoods, hollies, junipers, magnolias, oaks, rhododendrons, and viburnums. It also includes geographic groupings of plants from both relatively nearby habitats (Cumberland River gorge, Southern United States coastal plains) and elsewhere in the world (California, central China, and Poland), as well as four nature trails with interpretive signs.

See also 
 List of botanical gardens in the United States

External links 
 The University of Tennessee Arboretum
 The University of Tennessee Arboretum Society

Arboreta in Tennessee
Botanical gardens in Tennessee
Oak Ridge, Tennessee
Protected areas of Anderson County, Tennessee
University of Tennessee